The 1977 McNeese State Cowboys football team was an American football team that represented McNeese State University as a member of the Southland Conference (Southland) during the 1977 NCAA Division I football season. In their eighth year under head coach Jack Doland, the team compiled an overall record of 5–5–1 with a mark of 1–3–1 in conference play, and were fifth in the Southland.

Schedule

References

McNeese State
McNeese Cowboys football seasons
McNeese State Cowboys football